The William Penn Foundation is a grant-making foundation established in 1945 in Philadelphia, Pennsylvania, by businessman Otto Haas and his wife Phoebe, and initially called the Phoebe Waterman Foundation.

It strives to improve "the quality of life in the Greater Philadelphia region through efforts that foster rich cultural expression, strengthen children’s futures, and deepen connections to nature and community."

In 2008, it disbursed new and continuing grants worth $62,974,512.

See also

 The Philadelphia Foundation
 Connelly Foundation

References

External links

Foundations based in the United States